The Cincinnati Masters or Cincinnati Open (branded as the Western & Southern Open for sponsorship reasons) is an annual outdoor hardcourt tennis event held in Mason, Ohio near Cincinnati. The event started on September 18, 1899, and is the oldest tennis tournament in the United States played in its original city. The tournament is the second largest summer tennis event in the U.S. after the US Open, as its men's event is one of the Masters 1000 tournaments on the ATP Tour and its women's event is one of the WTA 1000 events on the WTA Tour.

History
The tournament was started in 1899 as the Cincinnati Open and was renamed in 1901 to Tri-State Tennis Tournament, a name it would keep until 1969 (it would later be known by several other names, including ATP Championships), and would eventually grow into the tournament now held in Mason. The original tournament was held at the Avondale Athletic Club, which sat on property that is now Xavier University, and would later be moved to several various locations due to changes in tournament management and surfaces. The first tournament in 1899 was played on clay courts (described in a newspaper article of the time as "crushed brick dust"), and the event was mostly played on clay until 1979 when it switched to hardcourts.

In 1903, the tournament was moved to the Cincinnati Tennis Club, where it was primarily held until 1972. In 1974, the tournament was nearly dropped from the tennis calendar but moved at the last moment to the Cincinnati Convention Center, where it was played indoors and, for the first time since 1919, without a women's draw. In 1975, the tournament moved to the Coney Island amusement park on the Ohio River, and the tournament began to gain momentum again.

Between 1981 and 1989 it was a major tournament on the men's Grand Prix Tennis Tour and part of the Grand Prix Super Series.

In 1979 the tournament moved to Mason where a permanent stadium was built and the surface was changed from Har-Tru clay to hardcourt (DecoTurf II.). Later, two other permanent stadia were constructed, making Cincinnati the only tennis tournament outside the four Grand Slam events with three stadium courts – Center Court, Grandstand Court and Court 3. A new Court 3 was built in 2010, increasing the number of stadium courts to four, with the existing Court 3 renamed Court 9. The women's competition was reinstated in 1988 for one year, and then again in 2004 when the organizers, with the help of the Octagon sports agency, bought the Croatian Bol Ladies Open and moved it to Cincinnati.

In August 2008, the men's tournament was sold to the United States Tennis Association, the owners of the US Open.

In 2002, the tournament was sponsored for the first time by Western & Southern Financial Group, with the company continuing its sponsorship until at least 2016. In 2011 the men's and women's tournaments were played in the same week, and the name changed from the Western & Southern Financial Group Masters and Women's Open to the Western & Southern Open.

Paul M. Flory
In 1975, the tournament reins were taken by Paul M. Flory, then an executive with Procter & Gamble. During his tenure, the tournament enriched its considerable heritage while donating millions of dollars to charity: to Cincinnati Children's Hospital Medical Center, Tennis for City Youth (a program to teach tennis to inner-city children), and to The Charles M. Barrett Cancer Center at University Hospital.  Flory was honored with the ATP's Arthur Ashe Humanitarian Award, enshrinement in the USTA/Midwest Hall of Fame and the Cincinnati Tennis Hall of Fame, and was named one of the Great Living Cincinnatians by the Cincinnati Chamber of Commerce. Flory began his involvement as a volunteer with the tournament in the late 1960s and remained a volunteer until the end, never accepting a salary. Flory, who was born on May 31, 1922, died on January 31, 2013, remaining tournament chairman until his final day.

Venue
The tournament is played at the Lindner Family Tennis Center, located in the Cincinnati suburb of Mason, Ohio. It features a total of 17 courts, including four tennis stadiums—Center Court, Grandstand Court, Court 3, and Court 9 (formerly known as Court 3)—and among the few venues (e.g. with Madrid Open) other than Grand Slams with more than two permanent stadiums.

In 2009, the tennis tournament announced a $10 million upgrade to the facility, including the construction of a  West Building to add space for players, media and fans.

In 2010, the tournament announced plans to expand the grounds by more than 40% and add six new courts. One of those courts is Court 3, which serves as the third television court, while another court has seating for 2,500. A new ticket office, entry plaza, food court and exhibit areas also were added.

In June 2020, due to the COVID-19 pandemic, the tournament temporarily relocated to the Billie Jean King National Tennis Center in New York City to reduce unnecessary player travel by centralizing the tournament and the U.S. Open at one venue.

The venue hosts additional events including the Atlantic 10 Conference Tennis Championships, the Ohio Athletic Conference Tennis Championships, and both the boys' and girls' OHSAA state tennis championships, and has hosted an Association of Volleyball Professionals event, concerts, charitable events, and numerous regional and national junior tennis events.

Because of intentional design choices for the Lindner Family Tennis Center, the Cincinnati Masters is known as one of the more intimate environments for player-fan interaction. The layout of the facility promotes fan interaction as players walk from court to court among the fans, and the tournament publicizes player practice times on the numerous courts.

Past finals

Men's singles

Women's singles

Men's doubles (Open era)

Women's doubles (Open era)

Records

Men's singles
Roger Federer has won the most Cincinnati Open titles, and out of eight finals, he possesses seven titles; his last being won in 2015, defeating two-time champion Novak Djokovic in the final. It was at this tournament in 2018 that Djokovic became the first player to win the Golden Masters (winning all 9 masters). Djokovic then completed this again in 2020 for the double Golden Masters.

Women's singles

Men's doubles

Women's doubles

Overall records
 Overall records include combined totals of singles and doubles events:

References

External links

 Official tournament website
 The Cincinnati Enquirers Special Section on the Tournament's 100th Anniversary (1999)
 Cincinnati Enquirer Article on Paul Flory (1999)
 Facts on Paul Flory from Cincinnati Enquirer Article (1999)
 Cincinnati Enquirer Article on The 25 Best Matches Of The Tournament's First 25 Years in Mason (August 6, 2004)

 
Grand Prix tennis circuit
Hard court tennis tournaments in the United States
Cincinnati
Sports competitions in Cincinnati
Recurring sporting events established in 1899
Tourist attractions in Warren County, Ohio
US Open Series
Western and Southern Open champions
ATP Tour Masters 1000
1899 establishments in Ohio
Sports competitions in Mason, Ohio